In combinatorial mathematics, probability, and computer science, in the longest alternating subsequence problem, one wants to find a subsequence of a given sequence in which the elements are in alternating order, and in which the sequence is as long as possible.

Formally, if  is a sequence of distinct real numbers, then the subsequence  is alternating<ref
name="Stanleybook"></ref> (or zigzag or down-up) if

Similarly,  is reverse alternating (or up-down) if 

For example, if we consider some of the permutations of the integers 1,2,3,4,5, we have that
 ; because any sequence of 2 distinct digits are (by definition) alternating. (for example 1,2 or 1,4 or 3,5);
  because 1,5,3,4 and 1,5,2,4 and 1,3,2,4 are all alternating, and there is no alternating subsequence with more elements;
  because 5,3,4,1,2 is itself alternating.

Efficient algorithms 

The longest alternating subsequence problem is solvable in time , where  is the length of the original sequence.

Distributional results 

name="widom"></ref><ref
name="stanley"></ref><ref
name="hr"></ref>
that

Online algorithms 

and without the possibility of recalling on preceding observations.

Given a sequence  of independent random variables with common continuous distribution , it is possible to construct a selection procedure that maximizes the expected number of alternating selections. 
Such expected values can be tightly estimated, and it equals .

As , the optimal number of online alternating selections appropriately centered and scaled converges to a normal distribution.

See also 

 Alternating permutation
 Permutation pattern and pattern avoidance
 Counting local maxima and/or local minima in a given sequence
 Turning point tests for testing statistical independence of  observations
 Number of alternating runs
 Longest increasing subsequence
 Longest common subsequence problem

References 

Problems on strings
Permutations
Combinatorics
Dynamic programming